Interstate 95 (I-95) is a part of the Interstate Highway System that parallels the East Coast of the United States from Miami, Florida, in the south to Houlton, Maine, in the north. In the US state of Massachusetts, it spans  along a north–south axis. It is the third-longest Interstate Highway in Massachusetts, behind I-90 (the Massachusetts Turnpike) and I-495, while I-95 in full is the longest north–south Interstate and sixth-longest Interstate Highway in the US.

Its southern terminus within the state is located in Attleboro, where I-95 enters from Pawtucket, Rhode Island. It intersects with US Route 1 (US 1) and the northern terminus of I-295 within Attleboro, I-495 in Mansfield, and US 1 in Sharon before arriving at an interchange with I-93, US 1, and Route 128 in Canton. At this interchange, I-95 begins running concurrently with US 1 and Route 128 along a beltway roughly  outside of Boston. While earlier plans called for I-95 to run northeastward through Boston along the Southwest Corridor and a more northerly portion of Route 1 known as the Northeast Expressway, these plans were squashed due to fierce community opposition. As such, Boston is one of only two major east coast cities that I-95 bypasses (the other, Washington DC, for the same reason). 

While its concurrency with US 1 ends in Dedham, its concurrency with Route 128 continues as it meets with expressways including the Massachusetts Turnpike in Weston, US 20 in Waltham, Route 2 in Lexington, US 3 in Burlington (with which it runs concurrently within the town), and I-93 and US 1 in Reading and Lynnfield, respectively. I-95 and Route 128 split in Peabody, as Route 128 travels northeast toward its northern terminus in Gloucester, I-95 continues north and crosses US 1 in Peabody and Danvers. Within Salisbury, it intersects the northern terminus of I-495 and arrives at its own northern terminus, where I-95 continues into Seabrook, New Hampshire, as the Blue Star Turnpike.

Route description

Attleboro to Canton

I-95 crosses the state border from Pawtucket, Rhode Island, into Attleboro as a six-lane highway, with the first northbound exits, 2A and 2B, providing access to Route 1A and nearby US 1 near the border. (There is an exit 1, but it is a southbound-only exit connecting to US 1 south into Rhode Island). Exits 4–7 (old exits 3–5) also serve the Attleboro area, with exit 6 (old exit 4) at the northern terminus of I-295.

Exits 12A and 12B (old exits 6A and 6B) in Mansfield provide access to I-495, the "outer circumferential" beltway around Greater Boston. I-495 provides northbound connections to Worcester, the Massachusetts Turnpike, and the western part of the state, and southbound connections to Cape Cod. Mansfield is home to the Xfinity Center, a Live Nation Entertainment-owned amphitheater that hosts numerous concert events, and TPC Boston, a PGA Tour player's club that hosted the Dell Technologies Championship yearly. The two venues are located near I-95's interchanges with Route 140.

I-95 continues northward into Foxborough, home of Gillette Stadium, located on US 1 and accessible from exit 19 (old exit 9). As the Interstate continues through Sharon, it then enters Greater Boston and the towns of Walpole, and Norwood, before entering Canton, where it meets I-93 at its southern terminus, and I-93 continues as exit 26 (old exit 12) to the right of I-95, while I-95 traffic is routed in a single lane to a sharp clockwise curve where it meets US 1 in a wrong-way concurrency.

Canton to Peabody (Route 128)
Upon interchanging with I-93, I-95 loops around to the west, taking over the roadbed from I-93 and joining US 1 southbound in a wrong-way concurrency. Route 128 begins here as well. The highway enters Westwood next, with US 1 leaving the freeway near the Dedham town line to parallel I-95 back to the south. I-95 and Route 128 makes its way around Greater Boston, passing through Dedham, Needham, and Wellesley, where the freeway has an interchange with Route 9, and the freeway widens to eight lanes. Then, the highway passes through Newton, then enters Weston and has a large interchange with the Massachusetts Turnpike (I-90) that provides connections to nearby Route 30. There is a fourth lane after the interchange with Route 9. Exits 39A–B (old exits 23, 24, and 25) are one combined exit northbound.

I-95 and Route 128 are due west of Boston at this point and begin to turn to the northeast, serving the city of Waltham and the town of Lexington along the way. The freeway has an interchange with Route 2 (Concord Turnpike) at exit 45 (old exit 29). Upon entering the town of Burlington, I-95 and Route 128 have an interchange with US 3, the Northwestern Expressway, at exit 50A (old exit 32A). US 3 provides a direct freeway connection with the Lowell–Nashua, New Hampshire, metro area. Access to the Middlesex Turnpike and Burlington retail district is facilitated at this interchange as well. US 3 south briefly joins the freeway in another wrong-way multiplex in order to connect with its old alignment, leaving at exit 51A (old exit 33A). I-95 and Route 128 continue northeast through the city of Woburn and into Reading.

In Reading, I-95 and Route 128 once again have an interchange with I-93. After crossing, I-93, the now six-lane highway continues to the northeast, serving the towns of Wakefield, Lynnfield, and Lynn before crossing into Peabody, where Route 128 leaves I-95 at exit 64 (old exit 45) via the three left-most lanes as its own freeway toward Gloucester, while I-95 continues as the two right-most lanes in a somewhat sharp counterclockwise (albeit the fact that it contains two lanes) loop. Here, six lanes are designated for Route 128, while four lanes are designated for I-95.

Peabody to Salisbury
The freeway serves the communities of Danvers, Boxford, Topsfield, Georgetown, Rowley, Newbury, West Newbury, Newburyport, Amesbury, and Salisbury. Traffic density is generally low on this  stretch of freeway.

I-495 has its northern terminus at I-95 exit 89 (old exit 59) just south of the New Hampshire state line, a Y interchange that merges I-495 onto I-95. Northbound access to I-495 south is possible via exit 58 for Route 110 westbound, which leads to I-495's exit 119 (old exit 55) (I-495's last northbound exit before I-95). The northernmost exit in Massachusetts is exit 90 (old exit 60), providing access to Main Street toward Amesbury and Route 286 toward Salisbury Beach and Hampton Beach (the southbound ramp starts in New Hampshire). After crossing underneath the connecting roads, I-95 crosses the state line into Seabrook, New Hampshire.

Rest areas and service plazas
This is a list of rest areas on I-95 in Massachusetts.
Mansfield Rest Area (milepost 10): It is Nnrthbound only between exits 7, 12A, and 12B (old exits 5, 6A, and 6B) and has portable restrooms, phones, and a picnic area.
North Attleborough Parking Area (milepost 10): It is southbound only between exits 12A, 12B, and 7 (old exits 6 and 5) and has a parking area and phones.
Westwood Rest Area (milepost 29): It is southbound only between exits 28 and 27 (old exits 14 and 13) and has restrooms, phones, and a picnic area.
Dedham Truck turnout: It is southbound only between exits 32, 31A, and 31B (old exits 17, 16A, and 16B) and parking only with no facilities.
Newton Service Plaza: It is southbound only near exit 37 (old exit 21) and has 24-hour food and fuel with McDonald's and Honey Dew Donuts.
Lexington Service Plaza: It is northbound only near exits 46A–B (old exits 30A–B) and has 24-hour food and fuel with McDonald's, Honey Dew Donuts, and Original Pizza of Boston.
Massachusetts Visitor Center (milepost 90): It is southbound only at the New Hampshire state line (exit 90, old exit 60) and has tourist information, restrooms, and phones.

Weigh stations
Weigh stations are located on the northbound and southbound sides of the highway at the following locations:
In Attleboro between exits 2 and 4 (old exit 3).
In Rowley between exits 76A, 76B, and 78 (old exits 53A, 53B, and 54).

Speed limits

History
The original plans called for I-95 to run through downtown Boston. The highway would have progressed from Route 128 and Readville, followed the Southwest Corridor, ran along Melnea Cass Boulevard in Roxbury, heading east, and joining the Southeast Expressway at South Bay, then north to the Central Artery at the South Station interchange with the Massachusetts Turnpike/I-90, and connecting with the Northeast Expressway at the Charlestown banks of the Charles River.

However, due to pressure from local residents, all proposed Interstate Highways within Route 128 were canceled in 1972 by Governor Francis Sargent with the exception of I-93 to Boston. The only section of I-95 completed within the Route 128 beltway by the Massachusetts Department of Transportation (MassDOT) was the segment from Saugus to the Massachusetts Avenue Connector in Roxbury. The Southwest Expressway and the Inner Belt highways were among the Sargent-canceled highways.

Between 1972 and 1974, plans were to extend I-95 along a northerly extension of the Northeast Expressway to Route 128 in northwestern Danvers. During this time, I-95 was officially routed along Route 128 from Canton to Braintree and north along the Southeast Expressway (also designated Route 3), from Braintree to Boston, then following the Central Artery, and continuing along the Northeast Expressway in Boston, Chelsea, and Revere.

When the Northeast Expressway extension (between Saugus and Danvers) was canceled in 1974, I-95's route shifted to its current routing along the perimeter highway (Route 128), and I-93 was extended to meet I-95 in Canton. For several decades, plans for the abandoned roadways could still be seen going from the end of the Northeast Expressway to the Saugus River in Saugus in the form of a graded but unpaved roadbed. Much of this was removed during the early 2000s. At the US 1/Route 60 interchange, one can still see unused bridges and ghost ramps that were originally intended to carry I-95.

MassDOT's Add-A-Lane project added a fourth lane in each direction along Route 128/I-95 from the I-93 interchange in Canton to the Route 9 interchange in Wellesley, where the rush-hour traffic has been for some time permitted to use the breakdown lanes on the highway shoulder. The section south of Route 9 was completed by late 2015, and the last section, from Needham to Wellesley, where construction started in 2015, was completed in 2019. Outside of Route 128, the state began a $285-million (equivalent to $ in ) project in 2012 to replace the John Greenleaf Whittier Bridge over the Merrimack River which included widening the highway to eight lanes (four in each direction) from the bridge to I-495. This project was substantially completed, and the full eight lanes opened in mid-2018.

Add-A-Lane project
The project consisted of adding a lane on the inside of each carriageway, complete with a  inside shoulder. The existing 1950s bridges, 22 in total, were replaced. The project included construction of a new two-lane ramp from Route 128 to I-95 in Canton and installation of a new interchange at Kendrick Street in Needham, designated as exit 35A (old exit 19A) with the ramps to Highland Avenue as exits 35B–C (old exits 19B–C).

During the initial construction of I-95, a provision had already been made for a fourth lane within the widely spaced median along the  length of I-95 running from just north of the US 1 interchange in Dedham northwestward to the Route 109 interchange, and this will finally be used for the Add-A-Lane project.

Construction on phase 1 was officially completed in October 2009. Construction of phase 2 of the project began in mid-2006. This phase of the project consisted of the replacement of the US 1 and Route 1A bridges over I-95 in Dedham along with the road widening between exits 27, 29A, and 29B (old exits 13, 15A, and 15B). Construction of four sound barriers between the US 1 and I-93 interchanges were also included. This phase was completed in early 2011.

Exit list
Massachusetts converted from sequential to distance-based exit numbering on I-95 in 2021. Exits 1, 2A, and 2B retained their numbers (Massachusetts opted not to use the number 0 for numbering exits).

References

External links

 Massachusetts
95
Transportation in Bristol County, Massachusetts
Transportation in Essex County, Massachusetts
Transportation in Middlesex County, Massachusetts
Transportation in Norfolk County, Massachusetts
Historic trails and roads in Dedham, Massachusetts